The  is a peninsula in the Yanbaru region of Okinawa Island. It is surrounded by Nago Bay to the east, the Haneda Inland Sea to the north, and the East China Sea to the west. It is mostly mountainous, with a few plains. The peninsula's northeasternmost point is Cape Bise. Due to a US military communications tower, the summit is off-limits. The peninsula was the center of power for the kingdom of Hokuzan in medieval times, and was the site of fierce fighting during the Battle of Okinawa in 1945.

Transportation

The Okinawa Expressway connects Naha to Nago. Japan National Route 58 crosses the bottom of the Motobu Peninsula. Japan National Route 505 connects Motobu Town to Haneji, as Japan National Route 449 connects Motobu to Nago. Both Route 404 and Route 449 run around the edge of the Motobu Peninsula.

Sites

In the area are Nago Castle and Nakijin Castle. The Native Okinawan Village is also there. Okinawa Churaumi Aquarium features the world's third largest aquarium tank.

Rivers

 Oigawa River
 Shiokawa River (a national natural treasure, the shortest river in Japan, and has salt water.)

Beaches

 Uppama Beach
 Emerald beach (inside Ocean Expo Park)
 Shiokawa Beach
 Nagahama Beach
 Forest of the 21st Century Beach

Geology

The east side of the Motobu Peninsula is truncated by the Nago fault, bounding the northwestern coast of Okinawa Island. This area is of zone of Paleozoic metamorphic and igneous rocks. The Pleistocene Ryukyu Group comprises the northern part of the peninsula.

Municipalities on the Motobu Peninsula

 Motobu
 Nago
 Nakijin

Events which took place on the Motobu Peninsula

Invasion of Hokuzan (1416)
Initial Japanese landing during the Invasion of Ryukyu (1609)
Fighting on Mount Yae during the Battle of Okinawa (1945)
Expo '75
Miss International 1975.

People from the Motobu Peninsula

Kanbun Uechi, the founder of Uechi-ryū, one of the primary karate styles of Okinawa, was from the Motobu Peninsula.

Nearby islands

 Iejima (also "Ie Shima") is near the Motobu Peninsula. Notably, Ernie Pyle died, on Iejima
 Kōri-jima, which is connects to Yagaji Island by a bridge
 Minnajima
 Sesokojima, which is connected to Motobu Peninsula by a bridge
 Yagaji Island, which is connected to Motobu Peninsula by a bridge

United States military operations on Motobu Peninsula

During the Battle of Okinawa, by April 10, 1945 the Motobu Peninsula had been mostly secured.

Motobu Airfield was located on Motobu Peninsula, but was decommissioned after 1945.

Other peninsulas on Okinawa

 Chinen Peninsula
 Henoko Peninsula
 Katsuren Peninsula
 Yomitan Peninsula

See also

 Eisa, a form of Okinawan dance
 Uechi-ryū, a style of karate founded by Kanbun Uechi
Naval Base Okinawa

References

External links and references

 Lonely Planet on Motobu Peninsula
 Places to see on Motobu Peninsula
 A google map
 A blog post, on Shiokawa River

Okinawa Prefecture
Tourist attractions in Okinawa Prefecture
Geography of Okinawa Prefecture